Gladstones Malibu is an American seafood restaurant located on The Pacific Coast Highway (California) in Pacific Palisades, California.  The original restaurant was opened in 1972.

History

The original Gladstones was opened by Robert J. Morris on the site of the former Ted's Grill in Santa Monica Canyon in 1972 and then moved to its home on the beach at 17300 Pacific Coast Highway in 1981.  Morris sold the restaurant in 1984 to W.R. Grace but repurchased it in 1990.  Richard Riordan, former Mayor of Los Angeles, has owned Gladstones since the mid-1990s.  In 2008, Gladstones was the 37th highest grossing independent restaurant in the country.  In 2009, the private company SBE assumed day-to-day operations as part of a management contract with Riordan which expired in 2014. Gladstone's re-assumed management of day-to-day operations thereafter.

The beachfront restaurant has undergone several name changes.  When Robert J. Morris opened the restaurant at the site of Ted's Grill, he named it Gladstone's 4 Fish. The restaurant is frequently cited as Gladstone's.  It is now called simply Gladstones.

The restaurant sells 35 tons of crab, 65,000 lobsters and 19 gallons of clam chowder each year.

On August 8, 2016 Los Angeles County officials were said to press California state officials to allow a 40-year lease of the site of the restaurant to attract a new restaurant to take the place of Gladstones at Malibu.  The restaurant is currently in negotiations with the county as to the terms of the lease contract and plans to continue operation. Gladstones is set to become a new culinary destination designed by renowned architect Frank Gehry and operated by celebrity chef Wolfgang Puck.The proposed project calls for an architecturally attractive waterfront dining destination with easy access to public transit, including the Santa Monica Big Blue Bus. Preliminary plans include casual dining areas serving a changing menu of locally-sourced, farm-to-table cuisine, a lounge, a rooftop bar, a public deck, small retailers including an ice cream shop, and a monument to the site’s well-known current tenant, Gladstones.

See also

 List of seafood restaurants

References

External links 
"Taking the bait" Los Angeles Times July 9, 2008 review
 https://palisadesnews.com/gladstones-becoming-frank-gehry-wolfgang-puck-restaurant/

Restaurants in Greater Los Angeles
Pacific Palisades, Los Angeles
Seafood restaurants in California
Restaurants established in 1972
1972 establishments in California